The Mansfield Covered Bridge is a Double Burr Arch double span truss bridge located on Mansfield Road (historic) and Big Raccoon Creek in Mansfield southeast of Rockville in Parke County, Indiana. Built by Joseph J. Daniels in 1867 at a cost of $12,200. At  it is the second 
longest covered bridge left in Parke County. This Historic Site rest on land provided by Luke Moody, of Parke County, Indiana and is open to the public all year.

History

Built for a time during which only wagons, horses and pedestrians used the bridge, the Mansfield Bridge has a  load limit. The bridge had been used for State Route 59 and in one recorded story, three loaded oil trucks approached the bridge together. The first truck stalled out just before leaving the bridge, and all three trucks came to a stop on the two spans. There was no apparent damage to the strong structure. The arches combined with the truss are able to support more weight than needed so the limit is in the decking and material used for it.

Mansfield Bridge was closed in 1980 for repair to the abutments, roof and decking. The roof and decks were replaced again in October 1990 by the Parke County Highway Department.

It was added to the National Register of Historic Places in 1978.

Gallery
The Mansfield Covered Bridge

See also
 Big Rocky Fork Covered Bridge
 Mansfield Roller Mill
 Pleasant Valley Cemetery
 Parke County Covered Bridges
 List of bridges documented by the Historic American Engineering Record in Indiana
 List of Registered Historic Places in Indiana
 Parke County Covered Bridge Festival

References

External links

Parke County Covered Bridge Festival

Covered bridges on the National Register of Historic Places in Parke County, Indiana
Bridges completed in 1867
Historic American Engineering Record in Indiana
Bridges Built by J. J. Daniels
1867 establishments in Indiana
Wooden bridges in Indiana
Burr Truss bridges in the United States